Hariot may refer to:

 Hariot Glacier, Antarctica
 Paul Auguste Hariot (1854-1917), French pharmacist and phycologist
 Thomas Harriot or Hariot (1560-1621), English astronomer, mathematician, ethnographer and translator
 Hariot Hamilton-Temple-Blackwood, Marchioness of Dufferin and Ava (1843-1936), British peeress, "diplomatic wife", and promoter of improved medical care for women in British India.

See also
 Harriot (disambiguation)